The A2214 is an A road in south London. It runs between the A202 Queen's Road and the A204 Effra Road. It is one of the many inner London roads that is not signposted for almost the full-length of the road. In 2020, the road saw an average of around 11,550 vehicles travelling along the road, down from approximately 14,850 in 2019.

References

2214